The 1882 Men's tennis tour  was composed of the seventh annual pre-open era tour and now incorporated 67 events. The Wimbledon Championships and Irish Championships was won by William Renshaw, the U.S. National Championships was won by Richard Sears collecting his second title other big winners were Richard Taswell Richardson picking up the Northern Lawn Tennis Championships and Ernest Renshaw winning the Princes Club Championships, The title leader this season was Robert W. Braddell winning 4 tournaments from 6 finals.

The tour started in April in Brighton, England and ended in November in Melbourne, Australia.

Calendar 
Notes 1: Challenge Round: the final round of a tournament, in which the winner of a single-elimination phase faces the previous year's champion, who plays only that one match. The challenge round was used in the early history of tennis (from 1877 through 1921), in some tournaments not all.* Indicates challenger
Notes 2:Tournaments in italics were events that were staged only once that season

Key 
Key

January to March 
No events

April

May

June

July

August

September

October

November

December 
No events

List of tournament winners 
Note: important tournaments in bold
  Robert W. Braddell—Brighton, Oxford, Lemington Spa, Derby—(4)
  William Renshaw -Cheltenham, Irish Championships, Wimbledon—(3)
  Michael Gallwey McNamara—Brighton, Waterford—(2)
  Charles Lacy Sweet—Cirecester, Exmouth—(2)
  Ernest Renshaw—Princes Club—(1)
  Richard Sears—U.S. National Championships—(1)
  Richard Taswell Richardson—Northern Championships—(1)
  Peter Aungier—Naas—(1)
  Arthur Allen—San Gabriel—(1)
  G. R. Brewerton —Edgbaston—(1)
  Humphrey Berkeley—Teignmouth—(1)
  George Butterworth—Bath—(1)
  John Jameson Cairnes—New York—(1)
  Joseph Sill Clark Sr.—Richfield Springs—(1)
  William Cobbold—East Grinstead—(1)
  Harry F. Connover—New York—(1)
  E. J. Charley—Belfast—(1)
  John William Down—Waterloo—(1)
  Mark Minden Fenwick—Newcastle—(1)
  A. A. Fuller—Brighton—(1)
  Harry D. Gamble—Toronto—(1)
  Charles Walder Grinstead—Brentwood—(1)
  G. F. Hanson—Belfast—(1)
  Arthur Wellesley Hallward—Darlington—(1)
  Lawrence Hobart—Montclair—(1)
  John Galbraith Horn—Edinburgh—(1)
  L. Keyser—Melbourne—(1)
  Herbert Lawford—Fulham—(1)
  G. M. Minchin—Exeter—(1)
  William Monement—Norwich—(1)
  Edward Lysaght—Limerick—(1)
  William C. Taylor—Eastbourne—(1)
  Alexander Van Rensselear—Hoboken—(1)
  A. Springett—Darlington—(1)
  Joseph Sill Clark Sr.—Newark—(1)
  Frederick C. Stammer—Lichfield—(1)
  Richard Barron Templer—Montrose—(1)
  Robert Shaw Templer—Armagh—(1)
  Charles E. Weldon—Bath—(1)
  Edward Lake Williams—Fulham—(1)
  Mr. Winslow—Chestnut Hill—(1)

Rankings 

Source: The Concise History of Tennis

See also 
 1882 in sports

Notes

References

Bibliography 
 Nauright John Dr. Sports Around the World: History, Culture, and Practice

Sources 
 Ayre's Lawn Tennis Almanack And Tournament Guide, 1908 to 1938, A. Wallis Myers.
 British Lawn Tennis and Squash Magazine, 1948 to 1967, British Lawn Tennis Ltd, UK.
 Dunlop Lawn Tennis Almanack And Tournament Guide, G.P. Hughes, 1939 to 1958, Dunlop Sports Co. Ltd, UK
 Lawn tennis and Badminton Magazine, 1906 to 1973, UK.
 Lowe's Lawn Tennis Annuals and Compendia, Lowe, Sir F. Gordon, Eyre & Spottiswoode
 Spalding's Lawn Tennis Annuals from 1885 to 1922, American Sports Pub. Co, USA.
 Sports Around the World: History, Culture, and Practice, Nauright John and Parrish Charles, (2012), ABC-CLIO, Santa Barbara, Cal, US, .
 The Concise History of Tennis, Mazak Karoly, (2010), 6th Edition, 2015. 
 Tennis; A Cultural History, Gillmeister Heiner, (1997), Leicester University Press, Leicester, UK.
 The Tennis Book, edited by Michael Bartlett and Bob Gillen, Arbor House, New York, 1981 
 The World of Tennis Annuals, Barrett John, 1970 to 2001.
 Total Tennis:The Ultimate Tennis Encyclopedia, by Bud Collins, Sport Classic Books, Toronto, Canada, 
 Wright & Ditson Officially Adopted Lawn Tennis Guide's 1890 to 1920 Wright & Ditsons Publishers, Boston, Mass, USA.
 http://tennisarchives.com/Tournaments 1882 
 https://app.thetennisbase.com/Season Year 1882

External links 
 http://www.tennisarchives.com/
 https://thetennisbase.com/

Pre Open era tennis seasons
1882 Men's Tennis season